Four ships of the Royal Navy have borne the name HMS Chester, after the city of Chester:

  was a 48-gun fourth rate launched in 1691. She was captured by the French in 1707 at the Battle at The Lizard.
  was a 50-gun fourth rate launched in 1708. She was on harbour service from 1743 and was broken up in 1750.
  was a 50-gun fourth rate launched in 1743 and sold in 1767.
  was a  light cruiser originally ordered for the Greek Navy in 1914 as Lambros Katsonis.  She was taken over before her launch in 1915 and was sold in 1921.

There was also a planned  named HMS Chester Castle. She was cancelled in 1943.

There was also an HMS Chester serving as a tank (water) vessel in the 1880s - saw service during the Egyptian campaign of 1882 when she was an "attendant" on HMS Alexandra; 21 men (her whole crew?) received the medal for Egypt serving aboard the ship.

A fictional HMS Chester appeared in the James Bond film Tomorrow Never Dies. The interior shots are actually from the Type 23 frigate . A Type 23 model was built for the exterior shots.

See also
 

Royal Navy ship names